Sapphire Technology is a Hong Kong-based technology company, founded in 2001, which produces graphics cards for personal computers and workstations, motherboards, TV tuner cards, digital audio players and LCDTVs

Sapphire's products are based on AMD graphics processing units, and both AMD (ATI) and Intel motherboard chipset technology. The company is the largest supplier of AMD-based video cards in the world.

Sapphire was the first company to release a video card with a high definition multimedia interface (HDMI) connector.

Sapphire was the first company to release a video card having clock speed of 1000 MHz (1 GHz) with the release of the Sapphire Atomic Edition HD 4890.

Manufacturing facilities
As of 2007, Sapphire has two ISO 9001 and ISO 14001-certified manufacturing facilities in Dongguan, China, which have a monthly production capacity of 1.8 million video cards.
The manufacturing facility had an area of about 250,000 m2 used by 16 independent production lines as of May 2005.

Manufacturing process

Sapphire buys printed circuit boards (PCB) from an external contractor, but they place components on the PCB and reflow them in their own factories. AMD GPUs have historically been used in their products.

Gallery

References

External links

2001 establishments in Hong Kong
Graphics hardware companies
Motherboard companies
Electronics companies of Hong Kong
Hong Kong brands